George Milton Neal (August 29, 1930 – December 1, 2016) was a United States Navy Petty Officer from Springfield, Ohio. He served with Helicopter Utility Squadron ONE (HU-1), a Navy Helicopter rescue unit embarked from Australian light cruiser HMAS Sydney during the Korean War and was awarded the Navy Cross for his actions on July 3, 1951, when, while serving with Helicopter Utility Squadron ONE, he and pilot Lt. j.g. John Kelvin Koelsch attempted to rescue Marine Corps Captain James Wilkins. Wilkins crashed near Yondong in North Korea after his Vought F4U Corsair took antiaircraft fire.

He died on December 1, 2016, and was interred in Arlington National Cemetery.

Navy Cross
The President of the United States takes pleasure in presenting The NAVY CROSS to
George Milton Neal, Aviation Machinist's Mate Third Class, U.S. Navy For service as set forth in the following citation:

Legacy
An Arleigh Burke-class guided-missile destroyer, DDG 131, will be named in honor of the Korean War veteran, and Navy Cross Recipient, Aviation Machinist's Mate 3rd Class George M. Neal.

References

Attribution:
 

1930 births
2016 deaths
United States Navy personnel of the Korean War
American prisoners of war in the Korean War
Burials at Arlington National Cemetery
People from Springfield, Ohio
Recipients of the Navy Cross (United States)
United States Navy sailors